Gargilesse-Dampierre is a commune in the Indre department in central France.

It is classified as one of "The most beautiful villages of France" and is situated near the confluence of the Gargilesse stream and the river Creuse. The 19th century writer George Sand lived in the village.

Population

See also
Communes of the Indre department

References

Communes of Indre
Plus Beaux Villages de France